William de Ferrers School is a co-educational British secondary school in the town of South Woodham Ferrers, in the English county of Essex. It is an academy school and has 1,520 pupils on roll, aged between 11 and 18. It has been awarded specialist sports, maths and computing college status. In 2011, it won the BBC Essex best sports school award.

History 
William de Ferrers was founded in 1982 and was opened in 1983 by Sir Keith Joseph (Secretary of State for Education and Science). The school bears the name of the Norman knight who was granted the land of the local area for his role in the Norman Conquest; the badge is his shield.

The school has had 4 headteachers since its creation:
 Dennis Parry from 1982 to his retirement in 2007
 Russell Ayling from 2007 to 2013
 Neal McGowan from 2013 to 2016, when he was charged with sexual offences against boys at the school
 Mike Applewhite from 2016 to present (2022)

Accommodation 
The School has houses that are purpose-built that opened 1982, which has been upgraded over the years. The school houses have been built to look traditional in order to blend in with the residential and commercial buildings in the town that have been also built to look characterful and old. The newest addition to the school to date is the new Sixth Form Block which was completed in 2011 and officially opened in September 2011 by guests including the mayor and mayoress of Chelmsford.

Extracurricular Activities 
The school has been praised for providing several extracurricular activities by Ofsted saying "Provision is greatly enhanced by extra-curricular activities, especially in sport. A major success through excellent care, guidance and support systems".

Activities range from the Duke of Edinburgh Award, sports, music, dance and drama. The school also offers a number of trips away both in the UK and within Europe with more recently trips to North and South America, China and Iceland being organised.

References 

Academies in Essex
Secondary schools in Essex
South Woodham Ferrers
Educational institutions established in 1982
1982 establishments in England
Specialist sports colleges in England
Specialist maths and computing colleges in England